The men's team pursuit in the 2008–09 ISU Speed Skating World Cup was contested over three races on three occasions, out of a total of nine World Cup occasions for the season, with the first occasion taking place in Berlin, Germany, on 7–9 November 2008, and the last occasion involving the event taking place in Erfurt, Germany, on 30 January – 1 February 2009.

Canada won the cup, while Italy came second, and Japan came third. The defending champions, the Netherlands, ended up in seventh place.

Top three

Race medallists

Final standings
Standings as of 1 February 2009 (end of the season).

References

Men team pursuit